Edward Aguilera (born December 17, 1976 in Spain) is a Spanish singer.

Singing career 
Aguilera became the only European in Menudo in 1991. Edgardo Diaz had plans to internationalize the band's line-up at the time, as all Menudos from past eras had been Puerto Ricans. When Aguilera joined, he became a bandmate of Menudo's first non-Puerto Rican member, Mexico's Adrian Olivares. Jonathan Montenegro, a Venezuelan who was the first South American Menudo, also became a member of the group at the time that Aguilera joined. For a small period, Aguilera became a teen idol in Puerto Rico.

Aguilera, Montenegro and two other band members left the group after a problematic 1991 year that saw Menudo members Sergio Blass and Ruben Gomez get arrested upon arrival at Miami International Airport while allegedly transporting drugs and the band be almost broken by a scandal in which Ralphy Rodriguez and his father accused Edgardo Diaz and Joselo (Menudo's choreographer), among others, of sexual abuse. The charges against Diaz and Joselo were never proven and Olivares was the only member not to leave the band.

The comparatively massive leaving of Menudo members at the time opened spaces for Abel Talamantez, Cuban American Ashley Ruiz, Puerto-Rican Andy Blazquez and Dominican Alexis Grullon, among others, to join the group.

Edward Aguilera left the group without recording any CDs with them.

After Menudo 
Edward Aguilera's singing career fizzled after he left Menudo. At this time he is reported to be finishing a degree in Architecture.

See also 
 List of Spaniards

External links 
 
 

1976 births
Living people
Menudo (band) members
Spanish male singers